The 1848 Florida gubernatorial election was held on October 2, 1848. Whig nominee Thomas Brown defeated the Democratic nominee William Bailey.

General election

Candidates

Whig 

 Thomas Brown

Democratic 

 William Bailey

Results

Results by County

See also

 1848 United States presidential election in Florida
 1848 United States House of Representatives election in Florida

References 

1848 Florida elections
Florida
Florida gubernatorial elections